The red triangle slug (Triboniophorus graeffei) is a species of large air-breathing land slug, a terrestrial pulmonate gastropod mollusk in the family Athoracophoridae, the leaf-veined slugs.

This large (up to ), often colorful and striking-looking species is found in eastern Australia. It is Australia's largest native land slug. It is a common part of the fauna.

Triboniophorus graeffei is the type species of the genus Triboniophorus. A closely related species is the as-yet-unnamed Triboniophorus sp. nov. 'Kaputar'.

Distribution

This slug species occurs on the east coast of Australia, from New South Wales to Queensland.

An affiliated bright pink species, Triboniophorus aff. graeffei, are found exclusively on Mount Kaputar.

Solem (1959) mentioned a possible introduction of this species to the New Hebrides, but no material was available to confirm it.

Habitat
Red triangle slugs are found in damp situations in various habitats, including city gardens, forests, woodland and heaths.

Life habits

These slugs graze on algae which grows on the surface of  the smooth bark of some eucalyptus trees and on rocks. Sometimes the slugs enter houses and have been known to graze on the mold that grows on bathroom walls.

This species of slug has been found to have an unusual defensive mechanism. It can secrete a kind of sticky mucus (different from the slippery slime secreted when it moves) that is strong enough to glue predators down for days. The glue is strongest in wet conditions and becomes less sticky as it dries. The cells responsible for secreting the glue are located across the dorsal surface.

Description
Red triangle slugs have two, not four, tentacles, and like other leaf-vein slugs, they have an indented pattern on their dorsum which resembles that of a leaf. The body length is up to 14 cm.

They are very variable in color. Individual slugs can be white, off-white, yellow, dark or light grey, beige, pink, red, or olive green. Each of the color forms have a red (possibly orange, magenta, or maroon) triangle on the mantle surrounding the pneumostome, and a red line at the edge of the foot. The texture of the dorsum of the slug can be smooth or very rough.

Juveniles lack the typical red foot border and red triangle of the adults but have three dark grey stripes running down the dorsal surface of their body and have the triangular mantle shield outlined with grey.

Research is currently being carried out in an attempt to determine if some of the different colourations may actually represent different species or subspecies.

Gallery
Various shots of Triboniophorus graeffei on the bark of Sydney Blue Gums, near Dungog, Australia, showing color variation, varying degrees of contraction and body shape.

References

Further reading
  Pfeiffer W. 1898. Anatomische und histologische Bemerkungen über Triboniophorus Graeffei Humbert. Sitzber. Ges. natf. Freunde, Berlin.

External links

Photographs on the life history etc.:
 Photo of about-to-hatch eggs and newly hatched juvenile, from Bill Rudman's site
 Feeding tracks on a tree trunk
 Showing detail of the head and triangle with pneumostome open
Photographs of the various different color forms:
 A mating pair of the white form on a tree trunk
 A yellow one with magenta markings, in the contracted state
 A dark yellow or orange individual with dark red markings
 A very good close-up photo of an actively crawling greenish-grey slug
 A photo showing a wide red margin of the foot on a cream-colored individual
 A cream-colored individual wrapped around a twig with pneumostome closed
 A beige individual with orange markings
  A solidly bright red individual

Athoracophoridae
Gastropods described in 1863